Daylon Leveller is a terrain/heightfield modeling program made by Daylon Graphics Ltd. of British Columbia, Canada. It was written by Ray Gardener in 1998 and is now at version 4.2. Leveller began as a fork of Gardener's earlier NavCam utility for the POV-Ray raytracer. It uses several third-party libraries, notably GDAL which provides georeferencing and additional file format support, and Lua which lets plug-ins and macros be easily scripted. Graphic tablets are supported including pressure sensitivity.

Leveller documents appear in a two-paned window showing a nadir (top-down) view of the heightfield and an OpenGL-based view showing the heightfield (and related elements) in 3D. Sculpting and most of the other tools can be used on either pane. Edits are reflected immediately in both views, providing an interactive feel to the modeling process. Modeling is based on a paint-program metaphor similar to Adobe Photoshop, with brushes, selection tools, etc. Textures and water level can be applied also. Heightfields can be planar (flat) or distorted using UV displacement mapping onto spheres, sphere sections, cones, cylinders, etc. Vector shapes are supported using a separate vector layer, and can be used to
situate edits and generate heightfield selection masks and formations. For civil engineers, cut/fill and cross-section analysis is available too.

Since version 3.0, Leveller includes vector shapes, which can be used for both modeling and coloration. With version 4.0, true 3D scene objects and shader-based ground textures can be placed. In version 4.1, Unicode is supported along with limited support for non-North American locales.

Leveller can export scenes to POV-Ray, RenderMan, and VRML. It uses plug-ins to handle other file formats and filter processes.

Leveller also supports raytracing, animation, and reference shape placement, although these features are secondary to its modeling abilities and were added mainly as prototyping conveniences.

Platforms
Leveller is available for 32-bit and 64-bit Microsoft Windows (version 2.6+ include some minor compatibility fixes for Vista and for Windows 7).

Related applications
Leveller is the base technology for Daylon Landshaper Golf, a higher-end civil engineering application for the golf-course design industry.

References
Daylon Graphics

Further reading
"Digital Sandbox" research paper by Ellen Yi-Luen Do of the University of Washington

Graphics software